Ann Christine Bell Vilsack (born July 9, 1950) is an American literacy advocate and politician. Vilsack is married to former Iowa Governor and United States Secretary of Agriculture Tom Vilsack.  She served as the First Lady of Iowa from 1999 until 2007. She was an unsuccessful 2012 Democratic nominee for U.S. Representative for Iowa's 4th congressional district.

Early life, marriage, and family
Vilsack was born Ann Christine Bell in Mount Pleasant, Iowa, where she was raised. Vilsack graduated from Kirkland College in Clinton, New York, in 1972.

She met her future husband, Tom Vilsack, while attending college. He reportedly approached her in the cafeteria and asked, "Are you a Humphrey or a Nixon supporter?" The couple married on August 18, 1973, in Mount Pleasant. They have two children.

Teaching career

The Vilsacks moved to Mount Pleasant in 1975. She began her career there as a librarian and a teacher.

For eighteen years she taught at the middle school level, and also at the high school level, leading classes in language arts and journalism. For another six years, she taught English and journalism at Iowa Wesleyan College. She worked as a reporter and columnist for the Mount Pleasant News. She earned a master's degree in journalism from the University of Iowa in 1992. In April 2013, she joined the U.S. Agency for International Development (USAID) as the Senior Advisor for International Education.

First Lady of Iowa
Christie Vilsack became First Lady of Iowa when her husband, Tom Vilsack was sworn in as governor in 1999. As First Lady, she focused on education and literacy issues.

As founder and president of the Vilsack Foundation, she partnered with the National Center for Family Literacy to promote media literacy with parents and their children.
In 2007, Christie Vilsack founded The Iowa Initiative, a privately funded foundation which aims to reduce the rate of unintended pregnancies among Iowa women ages 18 to 30. She served as executive director of the Initiative until February 2011, when she resigned to focus on exploring opportunities for seeking elected office. She now serves as chair of the Board of Directors.

Political career

In October 2009, Vilsack told WHO-DT she was considering a possible run against Republican Senator Chuck Grassley in the 2010 U.S. Senate election in Iowa. A Research 2000 poll for the website Daily Kos, conducted just days after the interview, showed that Grassley led Vilsack 51-40 in a hypothetical matchup, placing her in a statistical tie with the declared Democratic party candidates Roxanne Conlin and Bob Krause. She ultimately decided not to run.

In April 2011, Vilsack formed an exploratory committee to prepare for a potential campaign for Congress in Iowa's 4th District. She made her official announcement to run on July 19.  On November 6, 2012 she was defeated by five-term Republican incumbent Steve King 53%-45%.

She considered running against King again in 2014 but took a job with the United States Agency for International Development as the Senior Advisor on International Education instead.

References

External links
2012 Campaign contributions for Race: Iowa District 04, openSecrets.org; accessed May 14, 2017.

1950 births
Schoolteachers from Iowa
American women educators
Candidates in the 2012 United States elections
21st-century American politicians
First Ladies and Gentlemen of Iowa
Iowa Democrats
Literacy advocates
Living people
People from Mount Pleasant, Iowa
Women in Iowa politics
21st-century American women politicians
Iowa Women's Hall of Fame Inductees